Juan Zanelli  (1906–1944) was a Chilean racecar driver. He was born in Iquique, Chile in 1906. He raced in Grand Prix motor racing and hillclimbs from 1929 to 1936. In a Bugatti he won the 1929 and 1930 Bugatti GP at Le Mans, finished 8th in Alessandria in 1929 and 2nd in 1930, 2nd at the 1929 Marne GP and 3rd at the 1930 French GP at Pau. He won the 1933 Penya Rhin Grand Prix in Barcelona, Spain in an Alfa Romeo.

Zanelli won the Racing Cars division of the 1931 European Hillclimb Championship.

He died during a fight between members of the French Resistance (of which he was one), and members of the Gestapo, in the streets of Toulouse, France in 1944.

References

! colspan="3" style="background: #99ff66;" | Sporting achievements

1906 births
1944 deaths
Chilean racing drivers
Bugatti people
European Championship drivers
Grand Prix drivers
French Resistance members
Resistance members killed by Nazi Germany
French civilians killed in World War II